Oli or OLI may refer to:

Places 
 Oli-ye Jonubi, a village in Bushehr Province, Iran
 Oli-ye Shomali, a village in Bushehr Province, Iran

People 
 Óli, a Faroese and Icelandic given name
 Oliver (given name), nickname
 Oli (footballer), a retired Spanish footballer
 Oli (hip hop), part of French hip hop duo Bigflo & Oli
 Oli Udoh (born 1997), American football player
 KP Sharma Oli (born 1952), former Prime Minister of Nepal

Other uses 
 Cyclone Oli
 OLI-model or Eclectic Paradigm, a theory in economics
 Operational Land Imager, instrument on Landsat
 Operation Lifesaver, a railroad safety program
 Organizational Load Index, metric used by VoloMetrix

See also 
 Olli (disambiguation)
 Oly (disambiguation)